Nancy's Fancy is a small batch American gelato and sorbetto company. Based in Los Angeles, CA, the line was founded in 2015 by James Beard Foundation Award winner Nancy Silverton.

Nancy's Fancy uses ingredients from local markets to produce 15 flavors of gelato and sorbetto in pints. The company's production facility is located in a 6,000 square foot warehouse in the Arts District of Downtown, Los Angeles.

External links 
 Official Website

References 

Ice cream brands